Events from the year 1956 in Sweden

Incumbents
 Monarch – Gustaf VI Adolf
 Prime Minister – Tage Erlander

Events
16 September – Swedish general election
 The Husaby Affair around Florence Stephens.
 The disappearance of Gunnel Gummeson.

Popular culture

Sport
Guldpucken established
11-17 June - The country stages the Equestrian events in the 1956 Summer Olympics because of problems with quarantine laws affecting the host city of Melbourne

Theatre
The Eugene O'Neill Award established

Film
11 June – Seventh Heaven released 
10 September – The Staffan Stolle Story released

Births
 
18 March – Ingemar Stenmark, alpine skier.
2 May – Kenneth Johansson, politician
13 May – Staffan Hellstrand, rock musician, songwriter and record producer
23 May – Tomas Norström, actor and film director.
24 August – Clas Lindberg, film director and screenwriter
2 September – Marcus Wallenberg, banker and industrialist
8 November – Peter Lindmark, ice hockey player.
5 December – Peter Dalle, actor and comedian

Deaths
10 March – Åke Fjästad, football player (born 1887).
21 March – Per Kaufeldt, football player (born 1902)
7 April – Sven Linderot, politician (born 1890)
 Elin Engström, politician (Social Democrat), trade unionist and women's right activist (born 1860)
15 April – Leonard Peterson, gymnast (born 1857)

References

 
Sweden
Years of the 20th century in Sweden